Czerniec may refer to the following places in Poland:
Czerniec, Lower Silesian Voivodeship (south-west Poland)
Czerniec, Lesser Poland Voivodeship (south Poland)
Czerniec, Pomeranian Voivodeship (north Poland)